The Ghana Pharmacy Council is a statutory regulatory body established by an Act of Parliament of Ghana, Part IV of The Health Professions Regulatory Bodies Act, 2013 (Act 857). It is located in Accra, the capital of Ghana.Its core function is to secure public interest in the highest standards in the practice of pharmacy

References

Medical and health organisations based in Ghana
Pharmacy organizations